Rečica is a village in Croatia located east of Karlovac, with a population of 538 (2011).

Rečica is a lowland village made up of seven smaller villages. It is settled in the region of Donje Pokuplje on the left bank of river Kupa, about ten kilometers from Karlovac. During the 17th and the 18th century, Rečica was an important traffic locality because it was a place of cargo (mainly grain) discharge during the low water level of Kupa. Farming is still one of the main industries along with wine growing and livestock breeding.
 
The first mention of Rečica in official documents was in the 15th century, as a separate manorial estate gathered around a wooden palace which was an aristocratic manor in Rečica. The most important cultural and historical monument of Rečica and its surroundings is the Drašković castle, a remnant of a much bigger seigniory. The castle's most famous owner is the count Janko Drašković, who lived here in the first half of the 19th century. There is also the Church of St John the Baptist which dates from the 18th century.  Rečica also has an elementary school, an infirmary, a dentist, a veterinary, a grocery store and a cafe.

References

Populated places in Karlovac County